Kmetija 2018 (The Farm 2018) was the eighth season of the Slovene version of The Farm, a reality television show based on the Swedish television series of the similar name. This season's twist is that in addition to new contestants, some of the contestants are reality television stars from different series. Unbeknownst to the other contestants, former Kmetija contestants are also returning. These contestants have to try to convince the other contestants that they are ordinary traders looking for supplies, whilst stealing the supplies for themselves. The season premiered on 24 September 2018 on POP TV.

Finishing order
All contestants entered on Day 1.

The game

*In week 6, the rules of dueling were changed, and the duels now happen in pairs. A vote is performed to determine the first pair to compete, and the second pair is chosen by the first pair. The pair that loses is evicted.

References

External links

The Farm (franchise)
Slovenian television series